Big Bend Ranch State Park is a  state park located on the Rio Grande in Brewster and Presidio counties, Texas. It is the largest state park in Texas.  The closest major town is Presidio, Texas, where the state park's head office is located.  It includes Colorado Canyon.

Features

Big Bend Ranch is located adjacent to Big Bend National Park and shares the national park's Chihuahuan Desert ecosystem.  However, in one significant aspect the state park is managed very differently from the nearby national park, as the state park encompasses a network of cattle ranches operated according to the principle of the open range.  A herd of longhorn cattle is based here, and there is a semi-annual longhorn roundup.

The Big Bend Ranch manages  of frontage along the Rio Grande, and river rafting is popular here.  Away from the river, visitors can hike, backpack, go horseback riding or enjoy mountain biking in the Big Bend Ranch's substantial backcountry.  The park is open year round and an admission fee is charged.

Flora
Desert vegetation dominates the park including lechuguilla and grama grass. Other common plants include sotol, ocotillo and mesquite. Along the Rio Grande and around some of the springs in the park are reeds, willows, and cottonwood and ash trees. The park contains most of the existing populations of the federally threatened Hinckley oak.

Fauna
Common animals in the park include gray fox, desert cottontail, two species of raven, mule deer, coyote, seven species of owl, kangaroo rat, six species of woodpecker, greater roadrunner, two species of vulture, jackrabbit, collared peccary and many species of lizard. Rarer animals include the cougar, golden eagle, bobcat, peregrine falcon, zone-tailed hawk and western mastiff bat.

Feral burro herd 
The park has a herd of feral burros (donkeys), thought to have originated from Mexico or nearby ranches. From 2007-2008, efforts were made to cull the burro population; about 130 animals were killed. The cull was stopped to allow for efforts to trap and relocate the animals instead of killing them, but these were unsuccessful. Shooting of burros by the Texas Parks and Wildlife Department (TPWD) began again in 2011, but after public outcry and criticism from animal rights and rescue organizations, lethal control was stopped again in favor of non-lethal trapping and relocation. As of 2021, the burro herd remains at large, however TPWD has said that resumption of lethal control is "not likely".

Desert bighorn sheep re-introduction 
In early 2011, TPWD oversaw the transport of 29 desert bighorn sheep to the Bofecillos Range. It was hoped that this herd would become the ancestral animals of a self-sustaining population of bighorns within the park. The last unmanaged population of Texas desert bighorn sheep was shot or died around 1958.

Waterfalls

The Big Bend Ranch is home to Madrid Falls, the second highest waterfall in Texas.  The terrain around Madrid Falls makes it difficult to access.

Colorado Canyon

Colorado Canyon, within the park, is the "most accessible" of the area's river canyons.  Visitors may take short float trips through it, and it can be viewed from vehicle access points.  Other river canyons in Big Bend were carved out of limestone, which yields almost vertical walls.  Colorado Canyon is the only one carved from volcanic rock. Its mineral-rich soil makes the canyon "a hanging garden of yuccas, cacti, and other life."

Park management

Visitation
Big Bend Ranch State Park was expected to enjoy an estimated 2,500 visitors in 2008, a relatively low level of visitation for a park of its size. Visitors access the park via FM 170, a road that runs along the Rio Grande, or by an airstrip operated by Texas Parks and Wildlife.

Activities

The main activities are hiking, mountain biking, off-roading, paddling, and camping. The park is designated an International Dark Sky Park, and stargazing conditions are ideal.

A number of companies in the area offer tours of the Rio Grande River, with most being based out of Terlingua, Texas. They offer guided rafting trips, canoe trips, guided hikes and backroad tours that are structured to provide education about the region's history, geology, wildlife and plant life.

Recent events
The Nature Conservancy of Texas announced in November 2008 that they had purchased the Fresno Ranch, a  inholding within the state park, for the purpose of planning the transfer of the land to the state park for integrated park management purposes and eventual public enjoyment.  The price was said to be $2.6 million.  The ranch, which occupied several comparatively well-watered parcels of land within the park's boundaries, was in the southeastern quadrant of the park.

See also

Big Bend National Park
List of Texas state parks
Trans-Pecos
Guadalupe Mountains
McKittrick Canyon

References

External links
"Big Bend Ranch State Park," Texas Parks and Wildlife.

Protected areas established in 1988
Protected areas of Brewster County, Texas
Protected areas of Presidio County, Texas
Rio Grande
State parks of Texas
1988 establishments in Texas